Lake Gibson is a lake in Polk County, Florida, in the United States. The lake is a part of the Peace River - Saddle Creek Watershed.

The lake serves a seaplane base with a 7000 feet runway, and FAA code 8FA0.

Several neighborhoods and schools, including Lake Gibson High School, draw their name from the lake.

References

Gibson